Arthur Hardinge may refer to:

 Arthur Edward Hardinge (1828–1892), British Army officer
 Arthur Henry Hardinge (1859–1933), his son, diplomat

See also
Arthur Harding, rugby union player